Aide to the President of Iran is an official appointed by the President of Iran with the responsibility to aid him as a personal assistant.

List

Mahmoud Ahmadinejad 
 Ali Akbar Mehrabian, personal aide

Hassan Rouhani 
 Hossein Fereydoun, special aide
 Ali Younesi, aide for minorities
 Elham Aminzadeh, aide for citizenship rights
 Shahindokht Molaverdi, aide for citizenship rights
 Masoud Nili, aide for economic affairs

Ebrahim Raisi 
Farhad Rahbar, assistant for economic affairs

See also 
 Advisor to the President of Iran 
 Chief of Staff of the President of Iran
 Vice President of Iran

References 

Political office-holders in Iran